Sabine Transportation Company is a shipping company with headquarters in Cedar Rapids, Iowa. Sabine Transportation Company ships products worldwide. Sabine Transportation Company was founded in 1908 in Port Arthur, Texas. In 1998 Sabine Transportation Company was purchased by Stickle Enterprises in Cedar Rapids.Sabine Transportation Company operates dry bulk and tanker ships Sabine Transportation Company has operated under United States contracts with United States Agency for International Developmentto Sabine ship good for relief efforts to: Afghanistan, India, North Korea, Russia and Africa. Sabine Transportation Company tanker fleet transports, gasoline, and MTBE. Sabine Transportation Company ships are staff with a crew of about 25. Sabine Transportation Company has been active on the Mississippi river, Missouri river and Gulf of Mexico.Sabine Transportation Company has a fleet of tugboats and barges on the river system. In 1967 Sabine Transportation Company merged with Chromalloy American Corp. of St. Louis. Sequa Corp. of New York purchased Chromalloy in 1982. In 1992 Sabine was purchased by Kirby Corporation of Houston. With the 1998 purchase of Sabine Transportation Company by Stickle Enterprise, Sabine Transportation Company has been company the brand name of the shipping company. The fleet of ships becoming aged have been retired by 2005, Stickle Enterprises not longer is in the shipping indusrty.

Ships

Some Sabine Transportation Company ships type Type T2 tankers:
Trinity Built in 1944, a T2 tanker purchased 1958  (was Battle Mountain)
 Concho Built in 1944, a T2 tanker purchased 1979 (was Bradford Island)
R. P. Smith  Built in 1944, a T2 tanker purchased 1947 (was Edge Hilld)
Neches Built in 1944, a T2 tanker purchased 1947 (was Fisher's Hill )
Red River Built in 1945, a T2 tanker purchased 1978 (was Fort Hoskins)
Neches] (2) Built in 1945, a T2 tanker purchased 1947 (was Murfreesboro )
San Jacinto (2)] Built in 1944, a T2 tanker purchased 1975 (was Prairie Grove )
Brazos Built in 1945, a T2 tanker purchased 1955 (was Santa Paula)
Henry M. Dawes. Built in 1945, a T2 tanker purchased 1948 (was Signal Hill )
 Colorado Built in 1944, a T2 tanker purchased 1966 (was Tillamook)
 Llano Built in 1944, a T2 tanker purchased 1978 (was Tullahoma)
Frio (was Cantigny)

Liberty Ship:
Walther Du Mont (was Jean Baptiste Le Moyne),

World War II
Sabine Transportation Company as a major tanker operator during World War II. Sabine Transportation Company operated a fleet of tankers for the War Shipping Administration.  Keystone Shipping Company operated Type T2 tankers and other tankers.  Sabine Transportation Compan operated for the war a fleet of over 20 tankers. Sabine Transportation Company had a merchant crew of about 9 officers and 39 men.

See also
World War II United States Merchant Navy

References

External links
 The T2 Tanker page
 T-tanker list

American companies established in 1908
Transport companies established in 1908
Defunct shipping companies of the United States